is a former Japanese football player.

Club statistics
Updated to 23 February 2016.

References

External links

1986 births
Living people
Association football people from Saitama Prefecture
Japanese footballers
J1 League players
J2 League players
J3 League players
Urawa Red Diamonds players
Ehime FC players
Shonan Bellmare players
Kataller Toyama players
Association football midfielders